Toxicodendron parviflorum commonly known as small-flowered poison sumac is a much-branched shrub bearing stalked leaves with three leaflets; the end leaflet is larger than the other two. The leaflets are obovate, with rounded tips, tapering bases and irregularly toothed margins. The flowers are tiny, yellowish and fragrant. The fruit is small, round and red when ripe.

References

parviflorum
Plants described in 1891
Flora of West Himalaya
Flora of Nepal
Flora of Bhutan